Tamim Ahmed Chowdhury (25 July 1986 – 27 August 2016), known by his kunya Abū Ibrāhīm al-Hanīf, was a Bangladeshi-Canadian alleged to be the emir of the Islamic State (IS) in Bangladesh. He was the alleged mastermind of the July 2016 Dhaka attack at the Gulshan café, which resulted in 29 deaths. He was killed in a raid on an IS safehouse in Dhaka by Bangladeshi forces on 27 August 2016.

History
He was born on 25 July 1986 in Sylhet, Bangladesh. Chowdhury was formerly a resident of Windsor, Ontario, Canada.

He attended J.L. Forster Secondary School in Windsor. He competed for the school in a variety of track and field activities in 2004. He graduated from the University of Windsor in Spring 2011, with an honours degree in chemistry.

Amarnath Amarasingam, Post-Doctoral Fellow with the Resilience Research Centre at Dalhousie University, said of Chowdhury's time in Windsor, "There were a few [people] who knew him from the mosque and from the social circles" and "He was a shy, skinny kid."

The Windsor Islamic Association (WIA) commented, "We can confirm that Tamim Chowdhury was from Windsor, though he was not a well-known individual in the community," WIA spokesperson Lina Chaker said.

Islamic State
He may have travelled to Syria at some point in 2012–13. He returned to Bangladesh sometime afterwards.

He was described as the "prime architect" and "one of the masterminds" of the July 2016 Dhaka attack.

In April 2016, an interview with him was featured in the 14th edition of Dabiq, the official publication of the Islamic State. In the article, he was described as the "amīr of the Khilafah’s soldiers in Bengal" and was quoted as saying, "Bengal is an important region for the Khilāfah and the global jihād due to its strategic geographic position. Bengal is located on the eastern side of India, whereas Wilāyat Khurāsān is located on its western side." "Thus, having a strong jihād base in Bengal will facilitate performing guerilla attacks inside India simultaneously from both sides and facilitate creating a condition of tawahhush (fear and chaos) in India along with the help of the existing local mujāhidīn there."

Bounty
On 2 August 2016, it was reported that the Bangladeshi police had offered a reward of 200,000 Bangladeshi taka ($2,500) for information leading to his capture.

Death
Three militants, including Chowdhury, were killed during a joint forces raid at a house in Narayanganj Sadar Upazila on 27 August 2016. Monirul Islam, chief of Dhaka Metropolitan Police counter-terrorism unit, confirmed his death in an announcement reported in the Bangladeshi newspaper.

References

1986 births
2016 deaths
Islamic terrorism in Bangladesh
Canadian Muslims
Bangladeshi Muslims
Bangladeshi emigrants to Canada
Bangladeshi Islamists